James E. B. Mullineux (1872 – unknown) was an English professional footballer who played as a wing half.

References

1872 births
Year of death unknown
Footballers from Blackburn
English footballers
Association football defenders
Lincoln City F.C. players
Burnley F.C. players
Burton Wanderers F.C. players
English Football League players